The Roman Catholic Diocese of Santa Rosa in Argentina is located in the city of Santa Rosa, La Pampa, Argentina. It was established by Pope Pius XII on 11 February 1957, and is a suffragan diocese in the province of Bahía Blanca.

Bishops

Ordinaries
Jorge Mayer (1957–1972), appointed Archbishop of Bahía Blanca
Adolfo Roque Esteban Arana (1973–1984), appointed Bishop of Río Cuarto
Atilano Vidal Núñez (1985–1991) 
Rinaldo Fidel Brédice (1992–2008) 
Mario Aurelio Poli (2008–2013), appointed Archbishop of Buenos Aires (Cardinal in 2014)
Raúl Martín (since 2013)

Auxiliary bishop
Luis Dario Martín (2019-

References

Santa Rosa in Argentina
Santa Rosa in Argentina
Santa Rosa in Argentina
Santa Rosa in Argentina
1957 establishments in Argentina